Mary Felzkowski (née Behling; born September 25, 1963) is an American businesswoman and politician, currently serving in the Wisconsin State Senate, representing the 12th senatorial district.  A Republican, she previously served four terms in the Wisconsin State Assembly and was assistant majority leader.  She was known as Mary Czaja until her second marriage in 2016, on some documents she is still referred to as Mary Czaja-Felzkowski.

Early life and education 
Born in Tomahawk, Wisconsin, Felzkowski graduated from Tomahawk High School before earning a Bachelor of Science in Finance and Economics from the University of Wisconsin–River Falls.

Career 
Felzkowski is the owner of CIS Insurance Group in Tomahawk, Wisconsin. In November 2012, she was elected to the Wisconsin State Assembly as a Republican, succeeding Tom Tiffany, who was elected to the Wisconsin State Senate.

Felzkowski is a supporter of medical cannabis, and submitted a measure to legalize it in Wisconsin. Felzkowski has also advocated against the expansion of Medicaid. She is the Assistant Majority Leader in the 2019–2020 session of the Wisconsin Assembly.

After incumbent Tom Tiffany announced that he would run for Congress in the 7th congressional district special election, Felzkowski announced that she would run for his seat in the Wisconsin State Senate.

Personal life 
Felzkowski has been married twice and has five children. Felzkowski married on December 31, 2016.

She is a former president of Tomahawk Main Street, Inc., a community organization of Tomahawk businesses, and a former board member and national director of the National Association of Professional Insurance Agents. She is a lifetime member of the National Rifle Association.

References

External links
 Representative Mary Felzkowski at Wisconsin Legislature
 
 

Living people
People from Tomahawk, Wisconsin
University of Wisconsin–River Falls alumni
Businesspeople from Wisconsin
Women state legislators in Wisconsin
Republican Party members of the Wisconsin State Assembly
Republican Party Wisconsin state senators
1963 births
21st-century American politicians
21st-century American women politicians